Everett Riley York (June 25, 1860 – December 14, 1940) was an American lawyer who was one of the first law clerks to the justices of the Supreme Court of the United States, serving associate justice Stanly Matthews from 1886 to 1888.

Biography
York was educated in the public schools and at Cazenovia Seminary in New York. Then, he was an assistant reporter in the Senate at Harrisburg, Pennsylvania. Later he was stenographer in the courts in Schuylkill County, Pennsylvania. In 1880, he was secretary of the land commissioner of the Boston & Maine Rail Road at Lincoln, Nebraska. After moving to Washington, D.C., from 1883 to 1885, he was a private secretary to the assistant United States Postmaster General. In June 1884, York graduated with a LL.B. from National University School of Law in Washington, D.C. In June 1885, he was awarded a LL.M. The year following he began serving as law clerk to Justice Matthews.

In June 1889, York moved to Tacoma, Washington, and engaged in private practice with the Northern Pacific Railway and the firm of Mitchell, Ashton & Chapman. He also worked for the Tacoma Land and Import Company, and the Narrows Land Company. In 1901, he was nominated by the Republican Party and elected to the Washington State House of Representatives from the 34th district, and in 1903 from the 36th district.

Death
York died on December 14, 1940, in Tacoma.

Personal life
On June 15, 1887, York married Currence Bostwick Fitch in Washington, D.C. They had four children: a son, Arthur York; and three daughters, Florence York (Fawcett), Helen Denison York (McLaughlin) and Anne Moffat York (King).

See also
 List of law clerks of the Supreme Court of the United States (Seat 6)
 Clarence M. York
 Thomas A. Russell
 James S. Harlan 
 Thomas H. Fitnam
 Frederick Emmons Chapin

References

1860 births
1940 deaths
19th-century American lawyers
20th-century American lawyers
Law clerks of the Supreme Court of the United States
Lawyers from Washington, D.C.
People from Cazenovia, New York
Republican Party members of the Washington House of Representatives
Politicians from Tacoma, Washington
National University School of Law alumni